Veľké Kapušany is a small town on the eastern plains of Slovakia, not far from the Ukrainian border.

Name
The name "Kapušany" is probably derived from the Hungarian word kapu, meaning "gate".

History 
The territory of the town has been settled since time immemorial (findings from the Neolithic period). From the second half of the 10th century until 1918, it was part of the Kingdom of Hungary. The first written references to the settlement stems from 1211 ("Kapos") and 1214 ("Copus"). The settlement was awarded town status in 1430. The town was the second largest settlement (after Uzhhorod) of the Ung County and frequently served as a temporary or permanent station for migrants (Germans, Rusyns, Poles, Hungarians etc.) from the east to the west.

In the town square there is a garden with a plaque commemorating the day the Germans marched into Veľké Kapušany in 1944. This is significant as both Jews and Romas were persecuted and murdered by the Nazis during World War II. At that time, Veľké Kapušany was part of Hungary (based on the First Vienna Award).

The following villages were merged with the town:  Malé Kapušany (after 1913), Veškovce (1964).

City parts
Veľké Kapušany proper
Veškovce

Characteristics
Wood processing, food and building materials industries and Slovak and Hungarian high schools are located there as is a railroad transfer facility for goods on the broad gauge railroad to Ukraine.

Many Communist remnants remain, notably the apartment buildings of the Communist era, where mainly poor Roma people now live. The rest of the population lives in mostly comfortable-looking homes and farms outside of the main thoroughfare but still within the town's borders.

There are several churches, but no synagogue in Veľké Kapušany. On the outskirts of the town there is a heavily damaged Jewish cemetery.

Ethnic groups
According to the official census from 2001, the population include 56.98% Hungarians, 35.92% Slovaks, and 4.32% Roma.
In 1910, 33.8% of the population was Jewish.

Twin towns – sister cities

Veľké Kapušany is twinned with:
 Vásárosnamény, Hungary

Gallery

References

External links

Official site
Vel'ké Kapušany - ShtetLink

Cities and towns in Slovakia
Hungarian communities in Slovakia